Wesley Arrington Witherspoon (born January 27, 1990) is an American former professional basketball player.
He played college basketball for the University of Memphis Tigers.

Career
He was on the San Antonio Spurs roster, but did not play a game for them.
 
In 2014, Witherspoon was picked to play for the Air21 Express of the Philippine Basketball Association.

Witherspoon was signed for Helsinki Seagulls in September 2014 to play in Korisliiga, the top tier of Finnish basketball. Also rated in the top 100 shooters in the world for players 6'9" or above.

The Basketball Tournament
Wesley Witherspoon played for Team Memphis State in the 2018 edition of The Basketball Tournament. He averaged 7.0 points per game, 1.5 rebounds per game and 1.0 assists per game. Team Memphis State reached the second round before falling to Team DRC.

References

External links
D-League statistics

1990 births
Living people
Air21 Express players
American expatriate basketball people in Finland
American expatriate basketball people in France
American expatriate basketball people in Japan
American expatriate basketball people in the Philippines
American expatriate basketball people in Venezuela
American men's basketball players
Bambitious Nara players
Basketball players from Atlanta
Erie BayHawks (2008–2017) players
Guaiqueríes de Margarita players
Helsinki Seagulls players
Memphis Tigers men's basketball players
Rio Grande Valley Vipers players
Philippine Basketball Association imports
Shimane Susanoo Magic players
Shooting guards
Small forwards